Asythosia is a genus of moths in the subfamily Arctiinae. It contains the single species Asythosia velutina, which is found in Cameroon.

References

Natural History Museum Lepidoptera generic names catalog

Endemic fauna of Cameroon
Lithosiini
Monotypic moth genera
Insects of Cameroon
Moths of Africa